The Scania 3-series is a truck model range introduced in 1987 by Swedish truck manufacturer Scania. It is the successor of the 2-series.The 3 series came in a range of different engine sizes and horsepower from 9.0 litre 230 horsepower all the way up to 14 litre V8 500 horsepower engine. Production of the 3-series was stopped after the 4-series were introduced in 1995. The 3-series was the first series of Scania trucks to use the Streamline name, aiming to improve fuel efficiency and keep the styling up-to-date. The most notable changes were a redesigned bumper and front fascia incorporating a lower-drag grille design and full headlight bezels and an improved cab-side wind deflector design.

The Scania R143 is generally considered to be the best European tractor unit of its time. It is affectionately honoured by truck enthusiasts and has an unwavering reputation as a reliable and groundbreaking workhorse.

Gallery

See also
Scania 3-series (bus)
Scania PRT-range

External links

3Series
Vehicles introduced in 1987

Cab over vehicles